Yu v T & P Developments Ltd [2003] 1 NZLR 363 is a cited case in New Zealand regarding repudiation.

References

New Zealand contract case law
Court of Appeal of New Zealand cases
2003 in New Zealand law
2003 in case law